You're Gonna Hear from Me may refer to:
"You're Gonna Hear from Me" (song), a 1965 song from the film Inside Daisy Clover
 You're Gonna Hear from Me (album), a 1988 live album by jazz pianist Bill Evans